Elizabeth Janet Gray Vining (October 6, 1902 – November 27, 1999) was an American professional librarian and author who tutored Emperor Akihito of Japan in English while he was crown prince. She was also a noted author, whose children's book Adam of the Road received the Newbery Medal in 1943.

Early life and education
Elizabeth Janet Gray was born in Philadelphia, Pennsylvania on October 6, 1902. She was a graduate of Germantown Friends School and received an AB from Bryn Mawr College in 1923. In 1926, she earned an MS in library science from the Drexel University, and became a librarian at the University of North Carolina at Chapel Hill. She married Morgan Fisher Vining, associate director of the Extension Division of UNC, in 1929. In 1933, her husband was killed in a New York City automobile accident, and Vining was severely injured. During her convalescence, she converted to the Quaker faith.

Vining soon became known as an author, primarily of children's books, and was awarded the 1943 Newbery Medal for Adam of the Road. She had published eleven books by the end of World War II.

Private Tutor to the Japanese Imperial Family
From 1946 to 1950 during the Allied occupation of Japan after the war, Vining was selected by Emperor Hirohito himself (and not the United States government, as is erroneously claimed) to become a private tutor to Crown Prince Akihito, the heir apparent to the Chrysanthemum Throne. As part of her teaching program, she arranged for closely supervised occasions when four Western teenaged boys in Tokyo would get together to help the crown prince practice English conversation. She nicknamed the prince “Jimmy”.  ‘His interests in those days were almost entirely confined to fish,’ she wrote later, ‘and I felt they needed broadening.’ The influence of this American pacifist on the young prince was regarded with resentment by right-wing intellectuals; one of them would later complain that Akihito had contracted a spiritual and intellectual ‘fungus’ from his tutor.

In addition to teaching English-language skills, Vining introduced the children of the Imperial Household — Prince Hitachi and the Princesses Kazuko, Atsuko and Takako — to Western values and culture. She also lectured at Gakushūin and at Tsuda College.

For her work, she was awarded the Order of the Sacred Treasure, third class, shortly before her return to the United States in 1950.

Later life
After her return to the United States, Vining wrote a book about her experiences in Japan in Windows for the Crown Prince, which appeared in 1952. Vining went on to write over 60 fiction and non-fiction books in her lifetime. She also worked on the Board of Trustees of Bryn Mawr, as vice-president from 1952 to 1971 and was vice-chairwoman of the board of directors at the same time. In 1954 Vining received the Women's National Book Association Skinner Award, for "meritorious work in her special field". She received an honorary Doctorate of Literature from Wilmington College in 1962.

Honors
 Order of the Sacred Treasure, 1950
 Order of the Precious Crown

Publications
Meredith's Ann (1927)
Tangle Garden (1928)
Tilly-Tod (1929)
Meggy MacIntosh (1930)
Jane Hope (1933)
Young Walter Scott (1935)
Beppy Marlowe (1936)
Penn (1938)
Contributions of the Quakers (1939)
The Fair Adventure (1940)
Adam of the Road (1942)
Sandy (1945)
Windows for the Crown Prince (1952)
The World in Tune (1952)
The Virginia Exiles (1955)
Friend of Life: A Biography of Rufus M. Jones (1958)
The Cheerful Heart (1959)
Return to Japan (1960)
I Will Adventure (1962)
Take Heed of Loving Me (1963)
Flora: A Biography (1966)
I, Roberta (1967)
Quiet Pilgrimage (1970)
The Taken Girl (1972)
Being Seventy: The Measure of a Year (1978)
Harnessing Pegasus: Inspiration and Meditation (1978)
Mr. Whittier (1974)
A Quest There Is (1982)

References

Sources
 Bix, Herbert P., (2000). Hirohito and the Making of Modern Japan. New York: HarperCollins. ;

External links

 Japan America Society of Greater Philadelphia:  "The Emperor's Tutor."
 Quaker Obituaries 
New York Times obituary
Interview with Elizabeth Gray Vining from The Albert M. Greenfield Digital Center for the History of Women's Education
 Elizabeth Gray Vining Collection from Bryn Mawr College Art and Artifact Collections
 

American non-fiction children's writers
20th-century American non-fiction writers
American librarians
American women librarians
American expatriates in Japan
American Quakers
Bryn Mawr College alumni
Converts to Quakerism
Drexel University alumni
Newbery Medal winners
Newbery Honor winners
Recipients of the Order of the Sacred Treasure
Order of the Precious Crown members
Academic staff of Tsuda University
Germantown Friends School alumni
1902 births
1999 deaths
20th-century American women writers
University of North Carolina at Chapel Hill faculty
American women academics
20th-century Quakers